Niniwa Kiri Rata Roberts (also known as Nin Roberts; born 1 June 1976) is a New Zealand field hockey player. She competed for the New Zealand women's national field hockey team (the Black Sticks Women) between 2001 and 2008, including for the team at the 2004 and 2008 Summer Olympics.

Niniwa has a younger sister, Aniwaka, who was selected for the Black Sticks Women in November 2012.

International senior competitions
 2001 – Champions Trophy, Amstelveen
 2002 – Commonwealth Games, Manchester
 2002 – Champions Trophy, Macau
 2002 – World Cup, Perth
 2003 – Champions Challenge, Catania
 2004 – Olympic Qualifying Tournament, Auckland
 2004 – Summer Olympics, Athens
 2004 – Champions Trophy, Rosario
 2005 – Champions Challenge, Virginia Beach
 2006 – World Cup Qualifier, Rome
 2008 – Summer Olympics, Beijing

References

External links
 

New Zealand female field hockey players
Olympic field hockey players of New Zealand
Field hockey players at the 2004 Summer Olympics
Field hockey players at the 2008 Summer Olympics
1976 births
Living people
Field hockey players at the 2002 Commonwealth Games
Commonwealth Games competitors for New Zealand
Field hockey players from Auckland
20th-century New Zealand women
21st-century New Zealand women
People from Takapuna